Montréal/Boucherville Water Aerodrome  was located on the Saint Lawrence River near Montreal, Quebec, Canada. The airport was listed as abandoned in the 15 March 2007 Canada Flight Supplement.

See also
 List of airports in the Montreal area

References

Defunct seaplane bases in Quebec
Transport in Boucherville
Airports in Montérégie